Lockhart Road is a street spanning the whole length of Wan Chai from east to west on the Hong Kong Island of Hong Kong. It begins at Arsenal Street in the west and ends in East Point Road in East Point.

History
The road is named after Sir James Stewart Lockhart, Colonial Secretary of Hong Kong from 1895 to 1902, who signed the Convention for the Extension of Hong Kong Territory.

On 17 December 2005, during the WTO Conference, protestors from South Korea broke the police defensive line on Lockhart Road and attempted to break into the Hong Kong Convention and Exhibition Centre in Wan Chai North. This action developed into a major clash with the Hong Kong Police Force.

Bar district
Part of Lockhart Road near its western end is the backbone of one of Hong Kong Island's two main bar districts, the other being the slightly more upmarket Lan Kwai Fong and SoHo area. Once considered primarily a red light district, the area is now much more mixed, with bars, pubs, restaurants and discos. A number of the raunchier bars still remain, their doorways festooned with lightly clothed girls from Thailand and the Philippines. This is the area in which the novel and film The World of Suzie Wong were set.

See also

 Bottoms Up Club
 List of streets and roads in Hong Kong

References

External links
 

Causeway Bay
Red-light districts in Hong Kong
Wan Chai
Roads on Hong Kong Island